Cromore railway station (also known as Cromore Halt) served the seaside resort of Portstewart in County Londonderry, Northern Ireland.

History
  
The station was opened as Portstewart by the Ballymena, Ballymoney, Coleraine and Portrush Junction Railway in 1856.

From 1882 to 1926, the Portstewart Tramway provided a direct connection to the town of Portstewart and had its terminus at the station.

The station closed to passengers on 9 September 1963. It then re-opened on 10 March 1969, named Cromore and closed again on 15 May 1988.

References 

Disused railway stations in County Londonderry
Railway stations opened in 1856
Railway stations closed in 1988
Railway stations in Northern Ireland opened in the 19th century